Sackville Tufton may refer to:

 Sackville Tufton (c. 1647–1721), English army colonel and Member of Parliament
 Sackville Tufton, 7th Earl of Thanet (1688–1753)
 Sackville Tufton, 8th Earl of Thanet (1733–1786)
 Sackville Tufton, 9th Earl of Thanet (1769–1825)